Wi Parata v Bishop of Wellington was a New Zealand court case of 1877 which ruled  that the Treaty of Waitangi was a "simple nullity" having been signed by "primitive barbarians".

In 1877 Wiremu "Wi" Parata a wealthy Māori farmer and member of the Executive Council, described by the Dictionary of New Zealand Biography as having been "an astute politician and skilled orator and debater" took Octavius Hadfield, the Bishop of Wellington, to the Supreme Court, over a breach of oral contract between the Anglican Church and the Ngāti Toa, and a breach of the principles of the Treaty of Waitangi. 

Ngāti Toa had provided land to the church in 1848 in exchange for a promise that a school for young Ngāti Toa people would be built by the church. However no school was built, and in 1850 the church obtained a Crown grant to the land, without the consent of the iwi. The case was a failure for Parata – Chief Justice James Prendergast ruled that the Treaty of Waitangi was a "simple nullity", having been signed by "primitive barbarians". Prendergast had simply ignored the Treaty as a legal document.

The ruling had far-reaching consequences, as it was invoked as precedent during subsequent claims brought for breaches of the Treaty, well into the twentieth century.

See also
 Aboriginal title
 Treaty of Waitangi

References
 "The three precedents of Wi Parata", 2004, Canterbury Law Review
 
 Untangling the Foreshore

1877 in case law
High Court of New Zealand cases
Aboriginal title in New Zealand
1877 in New Zealand
Treaty of Waitangi
1877 in New Zealand law